Despite each receiving FIFA-affiliated status in 1913, both the United States and Canada have lacked a consistent, multi-division soccer system until recently. Consequently, the determination of champions has been problematic at times. The United States did not have a truly national top flight league until the FIFA-sanctioned United Soccer Association and the "outlaw" National Professional Soccer League, which had a network television contract, merged in November 1967 to form the North American Soccer League (NASL). The NASL considered the two pre-merge forerunner leagues as part of its history.

Before 1967, there were several regional and city leagues of various levels of quality. For example, the first and second incarnations of the American Soccer League constituted the premier level of professional soccer in the Northeastern United States, but they and teams from the St. Louis Soccer League would regularly defeat the best the other had to offer. These are only two of the most notable leagues of the regional era, as there were professional and amateur competitions in Chicago, California, the greater Western United States, Ontario, and Western Canada, among several other regions.

While the creation of the NASL in 1968 brought bonafide top-flight competition to the U.S. and Canada, its collapse in 1984 saw a temporary return to the fragmented regional structure. The merger of the Western Soccer League and third iteration of the American Soccer League created a national second division in the U.S. known as the American Professional Soccer League (APSL) in 1990. The APSL later absorbed the Canadian Soccer League, which at the time was an attempt at a wholly first division within Canada.

It was not until the establishment of Major League Soccer (MLS) in 1996 as part of FIFA's agreement to award the United States the 1994 World Cup that there was again a truly national, sanctioned first division in either country. Top Canadian teams resided at the second division until MLS expanded to Canada in 2007.

Given the tumultuous history of professional soccer in the United States and Canada, there is a broad history of champions of various kinds in both countries, both in leagues that comprised both nations and cups that were held in only one. This article takes into account all these competitions to compile an accurate listing of American and Canadian soccer champions with an eye towards maintaining continuity.

Background 

For teams in the United States and Canada, there are three major domestic trophies.

The primary focus is the league championship, a postseason knockout tournament held between the best teams from the regular season. This is presently determined via the MLS Cup. American and Canadian sports leagues typically have such playoff systems. These have their roots in long travel distances common in U.S. and Canadian sports; to cut down on travel, leagues are typically aligned in geographic divisions and feature unbalanced schedules with teams playing more matches against opponents in the same division. Due to the unbalanced schedule typical in U.S. and Canadian leagues, not all teams face the same opponents, and some teams may not meet an even number of times during a regular season, if at all. This results in teams with identical records that have faced different opponents differing numbers of times, making team records alone an imperfect measure of league supremacy. The playoffs allow for head-to-head elimination-style competition between teams to counterbalance this.

Secondary is the recognition of the best regular season record (an accomplishment known as the league premiership in Australia and New Zealand, countries with similar league structure to the U.S. and Canada). The MLS team with the highest point total during the regular season is awarded the Supporters' Shield.

Thirdly, there are the two countries' respective domestic cup competitions: the Lamar Hunt U.S. Open Cup and the Canadian Championship. These tournaments are unique to soccer among professional sports in the U.S. and Canada, as no other major team sport conducts competition outside of regular league play.

Additionally, American and Canadian clubs participate in the CONCACAF Champions League, a continental club competition in which the United States is allocated four qualification spots and Canada one. For American clubs, the winners of the MLS Cup, Supporters' Shield, and U.S. Open Cup all qualify, along with the regular season conference champion that does not win the Shield. The lone Canadian berth is determined by the Canadian Championship. Finally, there is the world championship as determined by the FIFA Club World Cup, a berth to which is earned by winning the Champions League.

American and Canadian soccer clubs exist in a franchise system, rather than a promotion and relegation system. As a result, teams do not systematically move between levels each season. This is standard among American and Canadian major and minor sports leagues and is part of the franchise rights granted by the leagues. Recently, a trend has developed where a club from the lower divisions may be "promoted" via an expansion franchise awarded by Major League Soccer.

The results in this article come from the United States Soccer Federation, the Canadian Soccer Association, the Rec.Sport.Soccer Statistics Foundation, and the American Soccer History Archives.

Major titles

American domestic competitions 

At various times, Canadian clubs have competed in the top-tier of American soccer, either in place of or alongside a Canadian top-tier league. Currently, three Canadian clubs compete in Major League Soccer.

United Soccer Association (1967)

National Professional Soccer League (1967) 

 Oakland also won the NPSL Commissioner's Cup nine days after winning the NPSL Finals.

North American Soccer League (1968–1984) 

  – The 1969 season featured no playoffs; the league title was awarded to the team with the most points in the season.
 # The New York Cosmos dropped "New York" from name for the 1977 and 1978 seasons, then returned to the full name in 1979 season.

Major League Soccer (1996–present)

U.S. Open Cup (1914–present)

Historical era

Modern era 

  – Championship awarded to Paterson when Scullin were unable to field a team for the replay, due to injuries and players under baseball contracts beginning the baseball season
  – Before the Spring 1931 season, Fall River Marksmen moved to New York City and merged with New York Soccer Club to become the New York Yankees. However, they began the 1931 tournament under the name Fall River, and as such were required to play as Fall River for the remainder of it, and won the Cup. Before the Fall 1931 season, the Yankees moved again, this time back north to New Bedford, Massachusetts. They merged with Fall River F.C. to become the New Bedford Whalers, and again won the Cup in 1932. The USSF officially credits "Fall River Marksmen" with four championships in total, and "New Bedford Whalers" with one.
  – St. Louis Soccer League team names were determined by the club's respective corporate sponsor. The team known as Hellrungs from 1929 to 1931 was also known as Stix, Baer and Fuller F.C. from 1931 to 1934, St. Louis Central Breweries F.C. from 1934 to 1935, and St. Louis Shamrocks from 1935 to 1938. As the change was only cosmetic and no relocations or mergers with clubs resulting in new rosters were made, the club's title history continues with the name changes.
  – Aggregate drawn 2–2, Championship shared when details for a third game could not be agreed upon.
  – Brooklyn Dodgers S.C. returned to their original name of Brooklyn Italians before the 1990s (the club states the change was in 1974, though later U.S. Open Cup tournaments have them registered under the Dodgers name).

Canadian domestic competitions

Canadian Professional Soccer League (1983)

Canadian Soccer League (1987–1992)

Canadian Premier League (2019–present)

Canadian National Championship 

Though there were various levels of professional leagues in Canada throughout the 20th century, there was no multi-division cup for professional franchises that stretched from coast to coast until 2002. Even then, it was not until 2008 that this trophy was awarded via competition that was separate from regular season play. From 1913 to 2001, the highest national cup in Canada was in fact the amateur Challenge Trophy, which still continues to this day after being replaced as the highest national cup competition in Canada by the professional Canadian Championship. The Open Canada Cup existed from 1998 to 2007, but excluded the premier professional clubs and was largely limited to the Ontario area.

Challenge Trophy

Voyageurs Cup / Canadian Championship

International competitions

Continental Championship

Champions' Cup Era

Champions League era

World Championship 

Before the inception of the seven-team FIFA Club World Cup, the Intercontinental Cup was held, beginning in 1960. As only the champions of UEFA and CONMEBOL were invited, it is not listed here.

Summer Olympics  

  – Footbal at Summer Olympics was played between club teams in between 1896–1904.

FIFA Club World Cup

Multiple majors in one season

Trebles 

In 2017, Toronto FC completed a treble of Supporters' Shield, MLS Cup and Canadian Championship, the first treble of any kind achieved by either an American or Canadian club since the beginning of Major League Soccer in 1996.

Doubles 

Listed here are the teams to achieve two major accomplishments in one season since 1968.

Overall totals 

Defunct franchises: .

  – If the full histories of the national championships were included, the table would be some 150 teams long and include dozens of defunct, historical, and strictly amateur (North American Division 4 or 5) squads. As North American Soccer League teams did not compete for the national championships, and for the sake of practicality, only the modern eras of the two national championship trophies (since 1995 for the U.S.'s Dewar Cup and since the inception of Canada's Voyageurs Cup in 2002) are included in this particular chart. For full national championship histories and totals, see below.
  – The current incarnation of the franchise is a namesake phoenix club that owns the rights to the club's name and history.
  – Team currently exists as a professional franchise in a Division II or Division III league, and as such are prevented from competing for two of the three domestic majors due to a lack of promotion and relegation.
  – The current incarnation of the franchise rebranded but owns the rights to the club's name and history.
  – Canadian soccer team.

Minor titles

Domestic competitions

Division 2 leagues 

Before the 1976 season, the American Soccer League placed its first teams on the west coast, going national. For the first time, the United States and Canada had a national-level second-division league. For 2017 the USSF granted provisional D2 status for both the NASL and the USL.

  – In 1989 the two largest U.S. leagues, the American Soccer League and the Western Soccer League, played a title game between their respective postseason champions as a precursor to the next season's merger.

Division 3 leagues

Canadian division 3 leagues 
There are three division 3 leagues in Canada: League1 British Columbia (BC), League1 Ontario (ON), and the Première ligue de soccer du Québec (QC). The Canadian Soccer League (CSL) was also classified as a division 3 league, but was de-sanctioned in 2013. 

  – PLSQ has no playoffs; the league title was awarded to the team with the most points in the season.
  – League1 Ontario has no playoffs at this season; the league title was awarded to the team with the most points in the season.
  – League1 Ontario's 2020 season cancelled due to COVID-19 pandemic.

Canadian division 3 National Championship

International competitions

Minor CONCACAF competitions

Cup Winners' Cup

Pepsi Cup

Professional Cup

Giants Cup

SuperLiga

Campeones Cup

Leagues Cup

CONCACAF League

Inter-confederation competitions

Copa Interamericana

Copa de Puerto Rico

Copa Merconorte

Copa Sudamericana

Other titles

Domestic competitions

American Historical

American Cup (1885–1924)

National Association Football League (1895–1921) 

  –  Clark and West Hudson finished tied and were declared co-champions.

American Soccer League I (1921–1933) 

The American Soccer League was the most prominent soccer league in the United States during the early 20th century. Some modern sources consider it to have been a major professional league.

American Soccer League II (1933–1975)

St. Louis Soccer League (1907–1939)

Lewis Cup (1915–1963) 
The Lewis Cup was an American soccer trophy originally given to the champion of the Blue Mountain League of northwestern Pennsylvania and later awarded to the winners of the American Soccer League's League Cup.

Western Soccer Alliance (1985–1989)/Lone Star Soccer Alliance (1987–1992)/American Soccer League III (1988–1989) 
 In 1985, several independent teams on the west coast formed the Western Soccer Alliance.  Dedicated to fiscal austerity, it succeeded where the United Soccer League, founded the year before, failed.  In 1987, the Lone Star Soccer Alliance imitated the success of the WSA in creating a viable regional league.  In 1988, the third version of the American Soccer League, was established as a regional, east-coast league.

Canadian Historical

Canadian National Soccer League (1926–1997) 

thecnsl.com - Canadian National Soccer Leagu / Update: 6 June 2022  RSSSF - Canadian National Soccer League / Update: 6 June 2022

Pacific Coast Soccer League (1939-1973)

Eastern Canada Professional Soccer League (1961-1966)

Western Canada Soccer League (1963-1970)

Women's D1 Leagues

Women's United Soccer Association

Women's Professional Soccer

National Women's Soccer League

Women's National Championships

Amateur era 

 1980: Seattle Sharks
 1981: Romiosa F.C.
 1982: F.C. Lowenbrau
 1983: Michelob Ladies
 1984: Chapel Hill Kix
 1985: Michelob Ladies (2)
 1986: Fairfax Wildfire
 1987: Michelob Ladies (3)
 1988: California Tremors
 1989: Michelob Ladies (4)
 1990: Opus County S.C.
 1991: Texas Challenge
 1992: Ajax America
 1993: Ajax America (2)
 1994: Sacramento Storm
 1995: Sacramento Storm (2)

Modern era

Canadian Women's D3 National Championships

Indoor

North American Soccer League (1971, 1975–76, 1978–84)

Major Indoor Soccer League I/Major Soccer League (1978–1992)

American Indoor Soccer Association/National Professional Soccer League (1984–2001)

Continental Indoor Soccer League (1993–1997)

World Indoor Soccer League (1998–2001) 

 League known as the Premier Soccer Alliance for the 1998 season.

Major Indoor Soccer League II (2001–2008)

Xtreme Soccer League (2008–2009) 

 League had no playoffs, regular season winner was champion.

National Indoor Soccer League/Major Indoor Soccer League III (2008–2014)

Professional Arena Soccer League/Major Arena Soccer League (2008–present)

See also 

 List of MLS Cup finals
 List of U.S. Open Cup finals
 Soccer Bowl
 USL Championship
 USL League One
 USL League Two
 USL Second Division
 National Premier Soccer League
 Canadian Soccer League
 Pacific Coast Soccer League
 United States Adult Soccer Association
 US Club Soccer
 National Amateur Cup
 National Women's Soccer League
 W-League
 Women's Premier Soccer League
 Women's League Soccer
 NCAA Men's Division I Soccer Championship
 NCAA Men's Division II Soccer Championship
 NCAA Men's Division III Soccer Championship
 NCAA Women's Soccer Championship
 NAIA national men's soccer championship
 Intercollegiate Soccer Football Association
 Pre-NCAA Collegiate Soccer Champions
 U Sports men's soccer championship
 U Sports women's soccer championship
 Canadian Colleges Athletic Association Soccer National Championships

References 

Major League Soccer lists
United States
National championships in the United States
North American Soccer League (1968–1984)
Lists of association football clubs